
Laguna Tanquina is a lake in the Beni Department, Bolivia. At an elevation of 176 m, its surface area is 14.8 km² and is within the area of Reserva Forestal Itenez, next to the northeastern border with Brazil.

References

Lakes of Beni Department